Adventures of The Felice Brothers Vol. 1 is available directly from The Felice Brothers at live shows. It was recorded on two-track tape in a chicken coop, "People seem to think that’s weird, but it was normal to us," Felice said. "It was like a little tiny dirty house". This album features "Frankie's Gun!", perhaps their most widely recognized song.  Adventures of The Felice Brothers Vol. 1 was listed as number 3 on WDST's Top 25 Albums of 2007, being beat only by Bruce Springsteen and Levon Helm.  Adventures also contains their covers of two classic folk songs. A song called Ruby Mae is also based on their grandpa's "old sweetheart" as the brothers say.  "Where'd You Get the Liquor" is a version of "Old Dan Tucker" and "Glory Glory" is a rendition of "Since I Laid My Burden Down".

Track listing
"Frankie's Gun!"
"Trouble Been Hard"
"Ruby Mae"
"Radio Song"
"Helen Fry (She's a Master of Disguise)"
"Walk a While"
"Whiskey in My Whiskey"
"Doris Day"
"Oxycontin"
"Where'd You Get the Liquor"
"The Devil Is Real"
"Glory Glory"
"San Antonio Burning"

References 

2007 albums
The Felice Brothers albums
Team Love Records albums